From the Heart is the fourth album released in 1966 by Tom Jones.

London Records (Parrot label) (USA, Canada) used many tracks from this album, combined with the hit singles  "Green, Green Grass of Home" and "Any Day Now" as Green, Green Grass of Home.

The front cover design, a photograph of Jones overlooking his hometown of Pontypridd, was taken on Graig Mountain, on the path above Graig Terrace that leads to Upper Alma Terrace in Treforest.

Track listing 
Side 1
"Begin the Beguine" (Cole Porter)
"You Came a Long Way from St. Louis" (John Benson Brooks, Bob Russell)
"My Foolish Heart" (Ned Washington, Victor Young) 
"It's Magic" (Jule Styne, Sammy Cahn) 
"Someday" (Jimmie Hodges) 
"Georgia on My Mind" (Hoagy Carmichael, Stuart Gorrell) 
"Kansas City" (Jerry Leiber, Mike Stoller) 
Side 2
"Hello Young Lovers" (Richard Rodgers, Oscar Hammerstein) 
"A Taste of Honey" (Bobby Scott, Ric Marlow) 
"The Nearness of You" (Hoagy Carmichael, Ned Washington) 
"When I Fall in Love" (Edward Heyman, Victor Young) 
"If Ever I Would Leave You" (Frederick Loewe, Alan Jay Lerner)
"My Prayer" (Georges Boulanger, Jimmy Kennedy) 
"That Old Black Magic" (Harold Arlen, Johnny Mercer)

Personnel
Charles Blackwell, John Scott, Johnny Harris - arrangements
Bill Price - engineer
Tony Frank - photography

References

Tom Jones (singer) albums
Decca Records albums
1966 albums
Albums produced by Peter Sullivan (record producer)